The Amarna letters (sometimes referred to as the Amarna correspondence or Amarna tablets, and cited with the abbreviation EA, for "El Amarna") are an archive, written on clay tablets, primarily consisting of diplomatic correspondence between the Egyptian administration and its representatives in Canaan and Amurru, or neighboring kingdom leaders, during the New Kingdom, spanning a period of no more than thirty years between c. 1360–1332 BC (see here for dates). The letters were found in Upper Egypt at el-Amarna, the modern name for the ancient Egyptian capital of Akhetaten, founded by pharaoh Akhenaten (1350s–1330s BC) during the Eighteenth Dynasty of Egypt. The Amarna letters are unusual in Egyptological research, because they are written not in the language of ancient Egypt, but in cuneiform, the writing system of ancient Mesopotamia. Most are in a variety of Akkadian sometimes characterised as a mixed language, Canaanite-Akkadian; one especially long letter—abbreviated EA 24—was written in a late dialect of Hurrian, and is the longest contiguous text known to survive in that language.

The known tablets total 382, of which 358 have been published by the Norwegian Assyriologist Jørgen Alexander Knudtzon in his work, Die El-Amarna-Tafeln, which came out in two volumes (1907 and 1915) and remains the standard edition to this day. The texts of the remaining 24 complete or fragmentary tablets excavated since Knudtzon have also been made available.

The Amarna letters are of great significance for biblical studies as well as Semitic linguistics because they shed light on the culture and language of the Canaanite peoples in this time period. Though most are written in Akkadian, the Akkadian of the letters is heavily colored by the mother tongue of their writers, who probably spoke an early form of Proto-Canaanite, the language(s) which would later evolve into the daughter languages of Hebrew and Phoenician. These "Canaanisms" provide valuable insights into the proto-stage of those languages several centuries prior to their first actual manifestation.

The letters

These letters, comprising cuneiform tablets written primarily in Akkadian – the regional language of diplomacy for this period – were first discovered around 1887 by local Egyptians who secretly dug most of them from the ruined city of Amarna, and sold them in the antiquities market. They had originally been stored in an ancient building that archaeologists have since called the Bureau of Correspondence of Pharaoh. Once the location where they were found was determined, the ruins were explored for more. The first archaeologist who successfully recovered more tablets was Flinders Petrie, who in 1891 and 1892 uncovered 21 fragments. Émile Chassinat, then director of the French Institute for Oriental Archaeology in Cairo, acquired two more tablets in 1903. Since Knudtzon's edition, some 24 more tablets, or fragments, have been found, either in Egypt, or identified in the collections of various museums.

The initial group of letters recovered by local Egyptians have been scattered among museums in Germany, England, Egypt, France, Russia, and the United States. Either 202 or 203 tablets are at the Vorderasiatisches Museum in Berlin; 99 are at the British Museum in London; 49 or 50 are at the Egyptian Museum in Cairo; 7 at the Louvre in Paris; 3 at the Pushkin Museum in Moscow; and 1 in the collection of the Oriental Institute in Chicago. A few tablets are at the Ashmolean Museum in Oxford and Royal Museum of Art and History in Brussels.

The archive contains a wealth of information about cultures, kingdoms, events and individuals in a period from which few written sources survive. It includes correspondence from Akhenaten's reign (Akhenaten who was also titled Amenhotep IV), as well as his predecessor Amenhotep III's reign. The tablets consist of over 300 diplomatic letters; the remainder comprise miscellaneous literary and educational materials. These tablets shed much light on Egyptian relations with Babylonia, Assyria,  Syria, Canaan, and Alashiya (Cyprus) as well as relations with the Mitanni, and the Hittites. The letters have been important in establishing both the history and the chronology of the period. Letters from the Babylonian king, Kadashman-Enlil I, anchor the timeframe of Akhenaten's reign to the mid-14th century BC. They also contain the first mention of a Near Eastern group known as the Habiru, whose possible connection with the Hebrews—due to the similarity of the words and their geographic location—remains debated. Other rulers involved in the letters include Tushratta of Mitanni, Lib'ayu of Shechem, Abdi-Heba of Jerusalem, and the quarrelsome king, Rib-Hadda, of Byblos, who, in over 58 letters, continuously pleads for Egyptian military help. Specifically, the letters include requests for military help in the north against Hittite invaders, and in the south to fight against the Habiru.

Letter summary

Amarna Letters are politically arranged in rough counterclockwise fashion:
 001–014 Babylonia
 015–016 Assyria
 017–030 Mitanni
 031–032 Arzawa
 033–040 Alashiya
 041–044 Hatti
 045–380+ Syria/Lebanon/Canaan

Amarna Letters from Syria/Lebanon/Canaan are distributed roughly:
 045–067 Syria
 068–227 Lebanon (where 68–140 are from Gubla aka Byblos)
 227–380 Canaan (written mostly in the Canaano-Akkadian language).

Akhenaten and Tushratta 

Early in his reign, Akhenaten, the pharaoh of Egypt, had conflicts with Tushratta, the king of Mitanni, who had courted favor with his father, Amenhotep III, against the Hittites. Tushratta complains in numerous letters that Akhenaten had sent him gold-plated statues rather than statues made of solid gold; the statues formed part of the bride-price that Tushratta received for letting his daughter Tadukhepa marry Amenhotep III and then later marry Akhenaten.

An Amarna letter preserves a complaint by Tushratta to Akhenaten about the situation:
I...asked your father Mimmureya [i.e., Amenhotep III] for statues of solid cast gold, ... and your father said, 'Don't talk of giving statues just of solid cast gold. I will give you ones made also of lapis lazuli. I will give you too, along with the statues, much additional gold and [other] goods beyond measure.' Every one of my messengers that were staying in Egypt saw the gold for the statues with their own eyes. ... But my brother [i.e., Akhenaten] has not sent the solid [gold] statues that your father was going to send. You have sent plated ones of wood. Nor have you sent me the goods that your father was going to send me, but you have reduced [them] greatly. Yet there is nothing I know of in which I have failed my brother. ... May my brother send me much gold. ... In my brother's country gold is as plentiful as dust. May my brother cause me no distress. May he send me much gold in order that my brother [with the gold and m]any [good]s may honor me.

Amarna letters list
Note: Many assignments are tentative; spellings vary widely. This is just a guide.

Chronology
William L. Moran summarizes the state of the chronology of these tablets as follows:

From the internal evidence, the earliest possible date for this correspondence is the final decade of the reign of Amenhotep III, who ruled from  1388 to 1351 BC (or 1391 to 1353 BC), possibly as early as this king's 30th regnal year; the latest date any of these letters were written is the desertion of the city of Amarna, commonly believed to have happened in the second year of the reign of Tutankhamun later in the same century in 1332 BC. Moran notes that some scholars believe one tablet, EA 16, may have been addressed to Tutankhamun's successor Ay. However, this speculation appears improbable because the Amarna archives were closed by Year 2 of Tutankhamun, when this king transferred Egypt's capital from Amarna to Thebes.

Quotations and phrases

A small number of the Amarna letters are in the class of poetry. An example is EA 153, (EA is for 'el Amarna'). EA 153, entitled: "Ships on hold", from Abimilku of Tyre is a short, 20-line letter. Lines 6–8, and 9-11 are parallel phrases, each ending with "...before the troops of the king, my lord."-('before', then line 8, line 11). Both sentences are identical, and repetitive, with only the subject statement changing.

The entire corpus of Amarna letters has many standard phrases. It also has some phrases, and quotations used only once. Some are parables: (EA 252: "...when an ant is pinched (struck), does it not fight back and bite the hand of the man that struck it?"....)

Bird in a Cage
A bird in a cage (Trap)—Rib-Hadda subcorpus of letters. (Rib-Hadda was trapped in Gubla-(Byblos), unable to move freely.)

"A brick may move.."
A brick may move from under its partner, still I will not move from under the feet of the king, my lord.—Used in letters EA 266, 292, and 296. EA 292 by Adda-danu of Gazru.

"For the lack of a cultivator.."
"For the lack of a cultivator, my field is like a woman without a husband."—Rib-Hadda letter EA 75

"Hale like the Sun..."
"And know that the King-(pharaoh) is hale like the Sun in the Sky. For his troops and his chariots in multitude all goes very well...."—See: Endaruta, for the Short Form; See: Milkilu, for a Long Form. Also found in EA 99: entitled: "From the Pharaoh to a vassal". (with addressee damaged)

"I looked this way, and I looked..."
"I looked this way, and I looked that way, and there was no light. Then I looked towards the king, my lord, and there was light."—EA 266 by Tagi (Ginti mayor); EA 296 by Yahtiru.

"May the Lady of Gubla.."
"May the Lady of Gubla grant power to the king, my lord."—varieties of the phrase in the Rib-Hadda letters

a pot held in pledge
a pot held in pledge—The Pot of a Debt. EA 292 by Adda-danu of Gazru.

7 times and 7 times again
7 times and 7 times—Over and over again
7 times plus 7—EA 189, See: "Etakkama of Kadesh"(title)-(Qidšu)

I fall ... 7 times and 7..."on the back and on the stomach"
I fall, at the feet, ... 7 times and 7 times, "on the back and on the stomach"—EA 316, by Pu-Ba'lu, and used in numerous letters to pharaoh. See: Commissioner: Tahmašši.

when an ant is struck..
"...when an ant is pinched (struck), does it not fight back and bite the hand of the man that struck it?"—A phrase used by Labayu defending his actions of overtaking cities, EA 252. Title: "Sparing one's enemies".

Example, single letter photo gallery, multiple sides
Amarna letter EA 15, from Ashur-uballit I; see also Amarna letter EA 153.

See also

Abdi-Heba
Amarna letters–localities and their rulers
Ashur-uballit I
Amarna Period
Hittite inscriptions
Labaya
List of Amarna letters by size
List of inscriptions in biblical archaeology
Mari Tablets
Mutbaal
New Chronology (Rohl)
See the town of "Lakiša", Lachish, for "find" of one tablet, EA 333
Šuwardata
Ugaritic texts

Notes

References
Goren, Y., Finkelstein, I. & Na'aman, N., Inscribed in Clay - Provenance Study of the Amarna Tablets and Other Ancient Near Eastern Texts, Tel Aviv: Sonia and Marco Nadler Institute of Archaeology, Tel Aviv University, 2004.

Further reading
Aruz, Joan, Kim Benzel, and Jean M. Evans, eds. Beyond Babylon: Art, Trade, and Diplomacy in the Second Millennium B.C. New Haven, CT: Yale University Press, 2008.
Cohen, Raymond, and Raymond Westbrook, eds. Amarna Diplomacy: The Beginnings of International Relations. Baltimore: Johns Hopkins University Press, 2000.
Moran, William L. The Amarna Letters. English-language ed. Baltimore: Johns Hopkins University Press, 1992.
Mynářová, Jana. Language of Amarna - Language of Diplomacy: Perspectives On the Amarna Letters. Prague: Czech Institute of Egyptology; Faculty of Arts, Charles University in Prague, 2007.
Petrie, W. M. Flinders Syria and Egypt From the Tell El Amarna Letters. Worcester, U.K.: Yare Egyptology, 2004.
Rainey, Anson F. Canaanite in the Amarna Tablets: A Linguistic Analysis of the Mixed Dialect Used by Scribes from Canaan. 4 vols. Atlanta: Society of Biblical Literature, 2010.
Rainey, Anson F., and William M. Schniedewind. The El-Amarna Correspondence: A New Edition of the Cuneiform Letters From the Site of El-Amarna Based On Collations of All Extant Tablets. Boston: Brill, 2014.
Vita, Juan-Pablo. Canaanite Scribes In the Amarna Letters. Münster: Ugarit-Verlag, 2015.

External links

CDLI, Chicago Digital Library Listing of the Amarna letters
Electronic version of the Amarna tablets, Akkadian in English transliteration.
High-resolution images, from the Vorderasiatisches Museum Berlin.
Mineralogical and Chemical Study of the Amarna Tablets - Provenance Study of the Amarna Tablets – University of Tel Aviv web page
 Sample letter
Text of some letters, archive.org

 
14th-century BC literature
1887 archaeological discoveries
Akkadian literature
Archaeological discoveries in Egypt
Extra-biblical references to Canaan
Diplomatic correspondence
Egyptian Museum
Egyptological objects of the Berlin State Museums
Egyptian inscriptions
Amarna